Common names: bromeliad boas, banana boas, neotropical dwarf boas.
Ungaliophis is a genus of dwarf boas found from southern Mexico to Colombia. Currently, two species are recognized.

Geographic range
Found from the Pacific coastal plain and Meseta Central of Chiapas in Mexico, south through Central America (Pacific Guatemala, Honduras, Nicaragua, Costa Rica and Panama) to Colombia.

Habitat
These snakes occupy a range of habitats from lowland rainforest to highland pine-oak forests to cloud forests. Their vertical distribution ranges from sea level to 2,300 m elevation.

Species

T Type species.

References

External links
 

Tropidophiidae
Snake genera